Amphibolidae is a family of air-breathing snails with opercula, terrestrial pulmonate gastropod molluscs.

This family of pulmonate gastropods, for breathe air, but also have opercula and at least some species go through a free-swimming veliger stage.

Taxonomy

2005 taxonomy 
According to the taxonomy of the Gastropoda (Bouchet & Rocroi, 2005), it was an only family within a superfamily Amphiboloidea in the informal group Basommatophora, within the Pulmonata.

2010 taxonomy 
Jörger et al. (2010) have moved Amphiboloidea to Panpulmonata.

Genera
Genera and species within the family Amphibolidae include:
 Amphibola Schumacher, 1817
 Lactiforis Golding, Ponder & Byrne, 2007
 Naranjia Golding, Ponder & Byrne, 2007 - with the only one species: Naranjia swatowensis (Yen, 1939)
 Phallomedusa Golding, Ponder & Byrne, 2007
 Salinator Hedley, 1900
Genera brought into synonymy
 Ampullacera Quoy & Gaimard, 1832: synonym of Amphibola Schumacher, 1817
 Thallicera Swainson, 1840: synonym of Amphibola Schumacher, 1817

References

External links 

 
Taxa named by John Edward Gray